Tim Palmer may refer to:

Tim Palmer (film historian) (born 1975), English film historian
Tim Palmer (journalist), Australian journalist
Tim Palmer (physicist) (born 1952), English physicist
Tim Palmer (record producer) (born 1962), British record producer